The 2017–18 Rugby Pro D2 was the second-level French rugby union club competition, behind the Top 14, for the 2017–18 season. It ran alongside the 2017–18 Top 14 competition; both competitions are operated by the Ligue Nationale de Rugby (LNR).

Teams

Changes in the lineup from 2016–17 were:
 Oyonnax won the 2016–17 Pro D2 title and were thereby automatically promoted to the Top 14. Agen won the promotion playoffs to secure the second promotion place.
 The two bottom finishers in 2016–17, Bourgoin and Albi, were relegated from Pro D2 to Fédérale 1. 
 The two bottom finishers in the 2016–17 Top 14 season, Bayonne and Grenoble, were relegated to Pro D2.
 Massy won the promotion group in the 2016–17 Fédérale 1 season; Nevers won the play-offs for the second promotion place. Since the 2015–16 season, the promotion process has been separate from the play-offs for the traditional Fédérale 1 championship prize, Trophée Jean-Prat.

Number of teams by regions

Competition format
The regular season uses a double round-robin format, in which each team plays the others home and away.

The LNR uses a slightly different bonus points system from that used in most other rugby competitions. It trialled a new system in 2007–08 explicitly designed to prevent a losing team from earning more than one bonus point in a match, a system that also made it impossible for either team to earn a bonus point in a drawn match. LNR chose to continue with this system for subsequent seasons.

France's bonus point system operates as follows:

 4 points for a win.
 2 points for a draw.
 1 bonus point for winning while scoring at least 3 more tries than the opponent. This replaces the standard bonus point for scoring 4 tries regardless of the match result.
 1 bonus point for losing by 5 points (or less). The required margin had been 7 points or less until being changed in advance of the 2014–15 season.

Starting with the 2017–18 season, Pro D2 conducts a play-off system identical to the one currently used in Top 14, with the top six teams qualifying for the play-offs and the top two teams receiving byes into the semi-finals. The winner of the play-offs earns the league championship and automatic promotion to the next season's Top 14; the runner-up enters a play-off with the second-from-bottom Top 14 team, with the winner of that play-off taking up the final place in Top 14.

This replaced the previous system in which the top team at the end of the regular season was declared champion, also earning a Top 14 place, while the second- through fifth-place teams competed in promotion play-offs. The play-off semi-finals were played at the home ground of the higher-ranked team. The final was then played on neutral ground, and the winner earned the second ticket to the next Top 14.

Promotion

Pro D2 to Top 14 
As noted above, both promotion places will be determined by play-offs from 2017–18 forward, with the winner of the Pro D2 play-offs earning promotion and the runner-up playing the second-from-bottom Top 14 team for the next season's final Top 14 place.

Fédérale 1 to Pro D2 
At the same time, LNR and the French Rugby Federation (FFR) will change the promotion process from Fédérale 1 to Pro D2. For three seasons (2017–18 to 2019–20), only one team will be promoted to Pro D2 through the Fédérale 1 competition. The second promotion place will be a "wild card" granted by LNR to a club that meets the following criteria:
 must be located in northern France (with the dividing line running approximately from La Rochelle to Lyon)
 have a long-term development plan
 location in an area that can demographically and economically support a fully professional club
Starting with the 2020–21 season, LNR will create a third professional league, slotting between Pro D2 and Fédérale 1 in the league system.

Relegation
Normally, the teams that finish in 15th and 16th places in the table are relegated to Fédérale 1 at the end of the season. In certain circumstances, "financial reasons" may cause a higher-placed team to be demoted instead, or bar a Fédérale 1 team from promotion.

Table

Fixtures & Results

Round 1

Round 2

Round 3

Round 4

Round 5

Round 6

Round 7

Round 8

Round 9

Round 10

Round 11

Round 12

Round 13

Round 14

Round 15

Round 16

Round 17

Round 18

Round 19

Round 20

Round 21

Round 22

Round 23

Round 24

Round 25

Round 26

Round 27

Round 28

Round 29

Round 30

Promotion Playoffs

Semi-final Qualifiers

Semi-finals

Final

Relegation playoff
The team finishing in 13th place of the Top 14 faces the runner-up of Pro D2, with the winner of this match playing in Top 14 in 2018–19 and the loser in Pro D2.

Attendances

 Attendances do not include the final as this is held at a neutral venue.  Also does not include the relegation playoff game.

Leading scorers
Note: Flags to the left of player names indicate national team as has been defined under World Rugby eligibility rules, or primary nationality for players who have not yet earned international senior caps. Players may hold one or more non-WR nationalities.

Top points scorers

Top try scorers

See also
2017–18 Top 14 season

Notes

References

External links
  Ligue Nationale de Rugby – Official website
  Midi Olympique

2017-18
Pro D2